Vieux-Port is a commune in the Eure department and Normandy region of France.

Population

Gallery

See also
Communes of the Eure department

References

Communes of Eure